Conium maculatum, colloquially known as hemlock, poison hemlock or wild hemlock, is a highly poisonous biennial herbaceous flowering plant in the carrot family Apiaceae, native to Europe and North Africa. A hardy plant capable of living in a variety of environments, hemlock is widely naturalized in locations outside its native range, such as parts of Australia, West Asia, and North and South America, to which it has been introduced. It is capable of spreading and thereby becoming an invasive weed.

All parts of the plant are toxic, especially the seeds and roots, and especially when ingested. The plant has a distinctive odour usually considered unpleasant that carries with the wind. The hollow stems are usually spotted with a dark maroon colour before the plant dies and becomes dry and brown after completing its biennial lifecycle. The hollow stems of this toxic plant are deadly for up to 3 years after the plant has died.

Description 
It has a smooth, green, hollow stem, usually spotted or streaked with red or purple on the top and lower half of the stem. Hemlock's flower is small and white; they are loosely clustered and each flower has five petals.

A biennial plant, hemlock produces leaves at its base the first year but no flowers. In its second year it produces white flowers in umbrella-shaped clusters.

Similar species 
Hemlock can be confused with the wild carrot plant (Daucus carota, also known as Queen Anne's lace). One can distinguish the two from each other by hemlock's smooth texture, mid-green, quite vivid, colour and typical height of large clumps being least , twice the maximum of wild carrot. Carrots have hairy stems that lack the purple blotches.

The species can also be confused with harmless cow parsley (Anthriscus sylvestris).

The plant should not be visually confused with the North American-native Tsuga, a coniferous tree sometimes called the hemlock, hemlock fir or hemlock spruce, from a slight similarity in the leaf smell. The ambiguous shorthand of 'hemlock' for this tree is more common in the US dialect than the plant it is actually named after. Similarly, the plant should not be confused with Cicuta (commonly known as water hemlock).

Taxonomy 
The genus name "Conium" refers to koneios, the Greek word for 'spin' or 'whirl', alluding to the dizzying effects of the plant's poison after ingestion. In the vernacular, "hemlock" most commonly refers to the species C. maculatum. Conium comes from the Ancient Greek κώνειον – kṓneion: "hemlock". This may be related to konas (meaning to whirl), in reference to vertigo, one of the symptoms of ingesting the plant.

C. maculatum, also known as poison hemlock, was the first species within the genus to be described. It was identified by Carl Linnaeus in his 1753 publication, Species Plantarum. Maculatum means 'spotted', in reference to the purple blotches characteristic of the stalks of the species.

Names 
Vernacular names in the English language are poison hemlock, poison parsley, spotted corobane (rarer forms), carrot fern (Australian Eng.), devil's bread or devil's porridge (Irish Eng.)

Distribution and habitat
The hemlock plant is native to Europe and the Mediterranean region.

It exists in some woodland (and elsewhere) in most British Isles counties; in Ulster these are particularly County Down, County Antrim and County Londonderry.

It has become naturalised in Asia, North America, Australia and New Zealand. It is sometimes encountered around rivers in southeast Australia and Tasmania. An outbreak of Poison Hemlock was reported in Reno Nevada USA by BeeHabitat.com.

Ecology
The plant is often found in poorly drained soil, particularly near streams, ditches, and other watery surfaces. It also appears on roadsides, edges of cultivated fields, and waste areas. Conium maculatum grows in quite damp soil, but also on drier rough grassland, roadsides and disturbed ground. It is used as a food plant by the larvae of some lepidoptera, including silver-ground carpet moths and particularly the poison hemlock moth (Agonopterix alstroemeriana). The latter has been widely used as a biological control agent for the plant. Poison hemlock grows in the spring, when much undergrowth is not in flower and may not be in leaf. All plant parts are poisonous.

Toxicity
Poison hemlock contains coniine and some similar poisonous alkaloids, and is poisonous to all mammals (and many other organisms) that eat it. Intoxication has been reported in cattle, pigs, sheep, goats, donkeys, rabbits, and horses. Ingesting more than 150–300 milligrams of coniine, approximately equivalent to six to eight hemlock leaves, can be fatal for adult humans. The seeds and roots are also toxic, more so than the leaves. While hemlock toxicity primarily results from consumption, poisoning can also result from inhalation, and from skin contact. Farmers also need to be careful that the hay fed to animals does not contain hemlock. Poison hemlock is most poisonous in the spring when the concentration of γ-coniceine (the precursor to other toxins) is at its peak.

Alkaloids

C. maculatum is known for being extremely poisonous. Its tissues contain different alkaloids. In flower buds, the major alkaloid found is γ-coniceine. This molecule is transformed into coniine later during the fruit development. The alkaloids are volatile; as such, researchers assume that these alkaloids play an important role in attracting pollinators such as butterflies and bees.

Conium contains the piperidine alkaloids coniine, N-methylconiine, conhydrine, pseudoconhydrine and gamma-coniceine (or g-coniceïne), which is the precursor of the other hemlock alkaloids.

Coniine has a chemical structure and pharmacological properties similar to that of nicotine. Coniine acts directly on the central nervous system through inhibitory action on nicotinic acetylcholine receptors. In high enough concentrations, coniine can be dangerous to humans and livestock. With its high potency, the ingestion of seemingly small doses can easily result in respiratory collapse and death.

The alkaloid content found in C. maculatum also affects the thermoregulatory centre by a phenomenon called peripheral vasoconstriction, resulting in hypothermia in calves. In addition, alkaloid was also found to stimulate the sympathetic ganglia and reduce the influence of the parasympathetic ganglia in rats and rabbits, causing an increased heart rate.

Coniine also has significant toxic effects on the kidneys. The presence of rhabdomyolysis and acute tubular necrosis has been shown in patients who died from hemlock poisoning. A fraction of these patients were also found to have acute kidney injury. Coniine is toxic for the kidneys because it leads to the constriction of the urinary bladder sphincter and eventually the accumulation of urine.

Toxicology
A short time after ingestion, the alkaloids produce potentially fatal neuromuscular dysfunction due to failure of the respiratory muscles. Acute toxicity, if not lethal, may resolve in spontaneous recovery, provided further exposure is avoided. Death can be prevented by artificial ventilation until the effects have worn off 48–72 hours later. For an adult, the ingestion of more than 100 mg (0.1 gram) of coniine (about six to eight fresh leaves, or a smaller dose of the seeds or root) may be fatal. Narcotic-like effects can be observed as soon as 30 minutes after ingestion of green leaf matter of the plant, with victims falling asleep and unconsciousness gradually deepening until death a few hours later.

The onset of symptoms is similar to that caused by curare, with an ascending muscular paralysis leading to paralysis of the respiratory muscles, causing death from oxygen deprivation.

It has been observed that poisoned animals return to feed on the plant after initial poisoning. Chronic toxicity affects only pregnant animals when they are poisoned at low levels by C. maculatum during the fetus' organ-formation period; in such cases the offspring is born with malformations, mainly palatoschisis and multiple congenital contractures (arthrogryposis). The damage to the fetus due to chronic toxicity is irreversible. Though arthrogryposis may be surgically corrected in some cases, most of the malformed animals die. 
Such losses may be underestimated, at least in some regions, because of the difficulty in associating malformations with the much earlier maternal poisoning.

Since no specific antidote is available, prevention is the only way to deal with the production losses caused by the plant. Control with herbicides and grazing with less-susceptible animals (such as sheep) have been suggested. It is a common myth that C. maculatum alkaloids can enter the human food chain via milk and fowl, and scientific studies have disproven these claims.

Culture

In ancient Greece, hemlock was used to poison condemned prisoners. Conium maculatum is the plant that killed Theramenes, Socrates, Polemarchus, Matthias Corvinus, and Phocion. Socrates, the most famous victim of hemlock poisoning, was accused of impiety and corrupting the minds of the young men of Athens in 399 BC, and his trial gave down his death sentence. He decided to take a potent infusion of hemlock.

See also
 List of poisonous plants

References

External links 

 
 

Apioideae
Flora of Europe
Plants described in 1753
Poisonous plants
Taxa named by Carl Linnaeus